Thai hip hop is hip hop music made in Thailand. Thai hip hop is distinguished from American hip hop by not only sound and language, but also by the culture from which the music is made.

History
The origin of Thai hip hop can be traced in Thailand from the mid-1980s, "Moo Tang Thong" (Moo's Golden Kick, หมูแข้งทอง) by Mister Tang Mo (มิสเตอร์แตงโม) in 1985 is credited as the first to sing hip hop music in the Thai language. However, there were earlier pop records which dabbled with rap such as Thaneth Warakulnukroh "Buea Kon Bon" (เบื่อคนบ่น), Domenant "Pak" (ปาก), and Rewat Buddhinan "Mun Plak Dee Na" (มันแปลกดีนะ).

The Thai hip hop scene started in early 1990s such as Jetrin Wattanasin and Touch Na Takuatung. Although they are representative of Thai pop, earliest Thai hip hop group TKO (Technical Knock Out) were signed to KITA Records and they first album in 1993 Original Thai Rap was produced by Kamol Sukosol Clapp, but commercially unsuccessful and influenced by US hip hop. 

Joey Boy's first album for Bakery Music in the same name, had hip hop influences from R&B and reggae and become hits on Thai radio station during the mid 1990s. For this distinction, Joey Boy becomes known as the Godfather of Thai hip hop.

One underground hip hop artist Dajim became so famous among underground music listeners in the early 2000s. He was signed with GMM Grammy's Genie Records division and produced his first hit album Rap Thai.

During the 2000s, with rap groups such as Southside, Fukking Hero, Sing Neua Seua Tai, Buddha Bless, and Thaitanium became primarily popular among hip hop fans.

Since crossing over into the mainstream in the 2010s, Thai hip hop has become one of the most popular in the internet and streaming era, with artists such as Illslick, D GERRARD, Youngohm, Younggu, PMC, and RachYO.

In mid-2021, "Ton" (ทน) a single of duo SPRITE x GUYGEEGEE debut #89 on the Billboard Global.

In October 2021, Thai hip-hop musicians F.HERO and Milli released single "Mirror Mirror," featuring Changbin of the South Korean boy group Stray Kids. With the social media app TikTok contributing to the song's international popularity, the music video for "Mirror Mirror" reached 53 million views as of February 2022.

Politics
In October 2018, a 10-member group called Rap Against Dictatorship (RAD) released a song and music video entitled "Prathet Ku Me" ("My Country’s Got..."). A member identifying themselves as Hockhacker explained the song's message, "As artists, we want to reflect the truth of the society we are living in under dictatorship." The song was received well, garnering 47 million views on YouTube (with a like/dislike ratio of 1M : 33,000) before being taken down. The government attempted to ban the song claiming content relating to the Thammasat University massacre violated the nation's Computer Crime Act, threatening to prosecute those who would share or republish the song or video. Blockchain technology was utilized by fans to prevent the government from accessing or deleting the video entirely, and it continued to be shared. A few days later, various police and government officials and spokespeople walked back previous statements and some showed support for expressing a variety of viewpoints.

See also
Music of Thailand
Phleng Thai sakon

References

 
Hip hop
Hip hop